The Fionia Bank Cup was a Danish football tournament between the three Triangle Region clubs, FC Fredericia, Kolding FC and Vejle Boldklub. The tournament was sponsored by the Danish Fionia Bank, and ran for one season.

Rules
The tournament was played twice a season, once for the autumn, and once for the spring-season. The results from the Danish 1st Division between the teams were used.

Prize money
The champion received 40,000 Danish kroner, runners-up 20,000 DKK and third place got 15,000 DKK.

Results

Spring 2006

Matches

Autumn 2005

Matches

External links 
Fionia Bank Cup – at Kolding FC's homepage

Defunct football cup competitions in Denmark
2005–06 in Danish football